Arthur Robert Mansell  (19 December 1904 – 26 July 1990) was an Australian politician.

He was born in Mildura and was a fruit grower in the district before entering politics. He served on Mildura City Council from 1945 to 1969 and was mayor twice between 1949 and 1951. A Country Party member, he was elected to the Victorian Legislative Council in 1952 for North Western Province. From 1969 to 1973 he was Deputy Leader of the Country Party in the upper house. Mansell retired from politics in 1973, in which year he was appointed a Commander of the Order of the British Empire. He married Dorothy Mable Davies, with whom he had four children. Mansell died in 1990.

References

1904 births
1990 deaths
National Party of Australia members of the Parliament of Victoria
Members of the Victorian Legislative Council
Australian Commanders of the Order of the British Empire
20th-century Australian politicians